The 1944–45 season was Real Madrid Club de Fútbol's 42nd season in existence and the club's 13th consecutive season in the top flight of Spanish football.

Summary
The club finished second in the league, just one point below champions CF Barcelona under management of Ramon Encinas. The team remained in contention for the title until match day 21, when archrivals Barcelona defeated Madrid 5–0 and shattered its chances to reclaim the championship. The squad reached the Copa del Generalísimo round of 16 after defeating SD Ceuta, but was eliminated in a playoff (tiebreaker) match by Sevilla. Barinaga scored and Pruden added two goals.

On 27 October 1944, the club started the construction of the new stadium at Chamartín.

Squad

Transfers

Competitions

La Liga

Position by round

League table

Matches

Copa del Generalísimo

First round

Round of 16

Statistics

Squad statistics

Players statistics

References

Real Madrid CF seasons
Real Madrid CF